The Searunner 40 is a trimaran sailboat from the 1960s designed by Jim Brown and John Marples. It is the largest boat in the Searunner series.

See also
List of multihulls
Jim Brown
Searunner 25
Searunner 31
Searunner 34
Searunner 37

References

Trimarans